The 1991–92 New Jersey Devils season was the 18th season for the National Hockey League franchise that was established on June 11, 1974, and 10th season since the franchise relocated from Colorado prior to the 1982–83 NHL season. For the third consecutive season, the Devils qualified for the playoffs, this time losing in the division semi-finals (4-3) to the New York Rangers.

Regular season
Goaltender Martin Brodeur made his debut with the Devils. Though he would only play four games during this season, he who would go on to become the franchise goaltender of the Devils.

The Devils scored the fewest power-play goals (59) and had the fewest power-play opportunities in the NHL (338).

Season standings

Schedule and results

Playoffs

Patrick Division Semifinals

(P4) New Jersey Devils vs. (P1) New York Rangers

The series opened at Madison Square Garden. The Rangers won game 1 4-2, but the Devils tied up the series in game 2 with a 7-3 drubbing over New York. Games 3 and 4 were at the Meadowlands in New Jersey. In game 3, the Devils were victorious by a score of 3-1. But in game 4, the Rangers blanked the Devils 3-0. Game 5 shifted back to New York, where the Rangers took a commanding 3-2 series lead by defeating the Devils 8-5. Game 6 was at the Meadowlands and the Devils won 5-3 tying up the series at 3 games apiece. Game 7 shifted back to Madison Square Garden where the Rangers won 8-4 over New Jersey and won the series 4-3.

Player statistics

Regular season
Scoring

Goaltending

Playoffs
Scoring

Goaltending

Note: GP = Games played; G = Goals; A = Assists; Pts = Points; +/- = Plus/minus; PIM = Penalty minutes; PPG = Power-play goals; SHG = Short-handed goals; GWG = Game-winning goals
      MIN = Minutes played; W = Wins; L = Losses; T = Ties; GA = Goals against; GAA = Goals against average; SO = Shutouts; SA = Shots against; SV = Shots saved; SV% = Save percentage;

Awards and records

Awards

Draft picks
The Devils' draft picks at the 1991 NHL Entry Draft.

Notes

References
 Devils on Hockey Database

New Jersey Devils seasons
New Jersey Devils
New Jersey Devils
New Jersey Devils
New Jersey Devils
20th century in East Rutherford, New Jersey
Meadowlands Sports Complex